Pol Havas (also Romanized as Pol Havās and Pel Havās; also known as Bolhavāz) is a village in Sanjabi Rural District, Kuzaran District, Kermanshah County, Kermanshah Province, Iran. At the 2006 census, its population was 117, in 25 families.

References 

Populated places in Kermanshah County